Zhou Jichang, Japanese: Shuu Kijou) (active late twelfth century) was a Chinese painter of the Song Dynasty (960 - 1279 AD). His artwork featured many central themes of Chinese Buddhism and Buddhist folklore.

His contemporary and associate was Lin Tinggui (see article for more details), as they were both responsible for the completion of the artistic project known as the Five Hundred Luohan in 1178 AD.

In the United States, his artwork is housed in the Smithsonian Freer Gallery of Art, Washington D.C., as well as the Museum of Fine Arts, Boston. Many of his other works of art are also located at the Daitoku-ji Temple in Kyoto, Japan.

His most famous painting is Rock Bridge at Tiantai Mountain.

See also
Chinese painting
List of Chinese painters
Mahayana
Guoqing Temple
Song Dynasty
Tiantai
Lin Tinggui
Zhiyi

External links
Museum of Fine Arts, Boston - Lin Tinggui and Zhou Jichang's artwork
Smithsonian Freer Gallery

Song dynasty painters
Song dynasty Buddhists
12th-century Chinese people
Year of birth unknown
Year of death unknown
Buddhist artists